An assassination attempt was made upon Chilean dictator Augusto Pinochet on 7 September 1986, when members of the urban guerrilla Manuel Rodríguez Patriotic Front, ambushed a motorcade carrying the dictator to Santiago.

Planning
1986 was considered by Manuel Rodríguez Patriotic Front the decisive year in their struggle against Pinochet. The guerrillas termed the assault "operación siglo XX" (Operation 20th Century). According to Patricio Manns the attack was in part planned in Switzerland and in his house in Paris where he lived in exile. Bulletproof vests for the operation were reportedly donated by conscripts in Sweden and Switzerland. 

The place of the attack, Cuesta de Las Achupallas, was carefully selected by the guerillas. Cuesta de Las Achupallas is a bottleneck road along mountainous terrain between Santiago and Cajón del Maipo. The guerrillas hired a house in the vicinity, pretending to pass as seminary students. The plan included the use of a heavy vehicle to block the advance of the motorcade.

The death of former President Jorge Alessandri on August 31 influenced events by making Pinochet travel back to Santiago, changing the schedule of the attack.

The ambush
When Pinochet's motorcade arrived to the selected area at 18:35 it came under heavy fire. The guerrillas had 17 rifles, all of them except one were M16 rifles, 10 M72 LAW rocket-propelled grenade launchers, one submachine gun and an "unknown number" of homemade grenades. Local mountainous geography prevented Pinochet's guard the use of radio communication with nearby military and police units. Albeit in a narrow road next to a ravine Pinochet's car managed to turn around and escape the scene not before being hit by a rocket-propelled grenade. The grenade fired on Pinochet's car did however not explode upon impact. Though Pinochet was unhurt, the shots killed five soldiers and injured eleven others. The guerrillas initially thought they had killed Pinochet and escaped the scene pretending to be part of security staff to evade incoming military and police.

Aftermath
The assassination attempt ushered a wave of repression against dissidents of the dictatorship. Opposition figures unrelated to the events such as Ricardo Lagos, Patricio Hales and Germán Correa were arrested and journalist José Carrasco was killed. The failure of Pinochet's attempted assassination led to an internal crisis in the Manuel Rodríguez Patriotic Front, leading to splits and to the complete autonomy of the group regarding the Communist Party of Chile by 1987. The attackers faced different fates, but many were hunted down either in October 1986 or in the years prior to the Chilean transition to democracy in 1990. José Joaquín Valenzuela, who was the "operative leader" of the attack was extrajudicially killed in Operación Albania. Some of the people involved in the attack ended up in prison where from where they escaped by a tunnel in 1990.

See also
Assassination of Carlos Prats
Assassination of Jaime Guzmán
Assassination of Orlando Letelier
Attempted assassination of Bernardo Leighton
Death of Eduardo Frei Montalva

References

1986 in Chile
Pinochet
September 1986 events in South America
Military dictatorship of Chile (1973–1990)
Augusto Pinochet
Manuel Rodríguez Patriotic Front